Alpha Theta may refer to:

Fraternities and sororities
Alpha Theta (sorority), a former college sorority, later named Alpha Delta Theta, that merged with Phi Mu fraternity
Alpha Theta, a gender-inclusive local fraternity at Dartmouth College, Hanover, New Hampshire
Alpha Theta Alpha, a local sorority at La Salle University of Philadelphia, Pennsylvania
Alpha Theta Omega, a Christian sorority with several chapters in the United States

Neuroscience
 Alpha-theta training, an area of brain wave science; see